Coldstream Football & Netball Club, nicknamed the Cougars, is an Australian rules football team. It is based in the Yarra Valley of Melbourne, Victoria, Australia and is part of the Eastern Football League.

History

Founded in 1890 in the town of Coldstream, the club had an erratic existence until it started regularly competing in the Croydon-Ferntree Gully FL in the mid 1950s.
It reformed in 1952 in the Yarra Valley competition before transferring to the Croydon-Ferntree Gully FL in 1956. It became one of the founding clubs of the Eastern District Football League in 1962.

The club had to wait until 1975 to achieve their first premiership in Division 3. They again were successful in 1986 and 1990.
Their last premiership was in 4th division in 2001.

Premierships

 1975, 1986, 1990, 2001

VFL/AFL players
Graeme Ellis - 
Jeff Hopgood - 
Jason Baldwin - Fitzroy, 
Daniel Hargraves -  , 
Lindsay Gilbee - 
Guy Richards - 
Bayley Fritsch -

References

External links
 cougars  Official club website
 Official Eastern Football League site

Eastern Football League (Australia) clubs
Australian rules football clubs established in 1890
1890 establishments in Australia
Sport in the Shire of Yarra Ranges